This is the list of awards and nominations received by My Love from the Star.

Awards and nominations

References

My Love from the Star